Mike MacDonald (born 1960) is an American photographer, photojournalist, speaker, author and conservationist. MacDonald's photos, primarily featuring prairies, savannas and other natural habitats around the Chicago metropolitan area, are internationally published. MacDonald's photographic technique blends concepts from landscape and macro photography to create a three-dimensional, immersive effect in his work. In 2015, MacDonald authored the coffee-table book My Journey into the Wilds of Chicago.

Chicago nature
MacDonald's work primarily focuses on the natural habitats of the Chicago area. In 2015, MacDonald authored the coffee-table book My Journey into the Wilds of Chicago: A Celebration of Chicagoland's Startling Natural Wonders, a collection built over two decades of more than 200 photographs and 30 profiles of Chicago area prairies, savannas, beaches and forests. Publishers Weekly called the book "celebratory, soulful and poetic," and its photos "glorious."

Publications
My Journey into the Wilds of Chicago, 2015, Morning Dew Press, with forewords by Bill Kurtis and Stephen Packard

References

External links
 

Living people
1960 births
American photojournalists
Landscape photographers
Nature photographers
Artists from Chicago
American botanical writers
American non-fiction environmental writers
American nature writers
American male non-fiction writers